Lewis Kidd (born 30 January 1995) is a Scottish professional footballer who plays for Albion Rovers as a full back or midfielder.

Kidd has previously played for Celtic, Falkirk, two spells with Queen of the South, East Kilbride and Edinburgh City.

Kidd has also represented Scotland at various youth levels.

Career
In February 2014, Kidd had a loan spell at Queen of the South from Celtic. In June 2014, after being released by Celtic, Kidd signed a permanent deal for the Dumfries club. Kidd scored two league goals and one cup goal in 75 competitive first-team matches for the Doonhamers, including a goal versus Rangers that was initially reported in the media as a Lee Wallace own goal. Kidd departed Queens at the end of the 2015–16 season.

On 15 June 2016, Kidd signed for Scottish Championship club Falkirk. On 19 May 2018, he signed a contract extension to remain with the Bairns until the end of the 2018–19 season. Falkirk were relegated to Scottish League One after the final league match of the season, despite defeating league champions Ross County 3–2 at the Falkirk Stadium and Kidd was then released by the Bairns.

On 25 June 2019, Kidd signed for Queen of the South for a second spell with the club.

On 9 July 2020, Kidd was announced as a new signing for East Kilbride. He was loaned to Albion Rovers in March 2021.

Edinburgh City announced the signing of Kidd on 4 June 2021.

Career statistics

External links

References

1995 births
Living people
Footballers from Bellshill
Scottish footballers
Celtic F.C. players
Queen of the South F.C. players
Falkirk F.C. players
Scottish Professional Football League players
Association football fullbacks
Association football midfielders
Scotland youth international footballers
East Kilbride F.C. players
Albion Rovers F.C. players
F.C. Edinburgh players